Willian Rodrigues de Freitas, known as Willian Rodrigues (born 9 September 1993) is a Brazilian professional footballer who plays as a defensive midfielder for Austrian Second League club FC Dornbirn.

Club career
He made his Austrian Football First League debut for SC Austria Lustenau on 21 July 2017 in a game against Floridsdorfer AC.

On 14 July 2022, Willian joined Austrian Second League club FC Dornbirn from Kuwaiti club Burgan.

References

External links
 

1993 births
Footballers from Curitiba
Living people
Brazilian footballers
Brazilian expatriate footballers
Coritiba Foot Ball Club players
AFC Eskilstuna players
Grêmio Barueri Futebol players
Clube Atlético Metropolitano players
SC Austria Lustenau players
SV Lafnitz players
SGV Freiberg players
Burgan SC players
FC Dornbirn 1913 players
Campeonato Brasileiro Série D players
Ettan Fotboll players
2. Liga (Austria) players
Oberliga (football) players
Campeonato Paranaense players
Association football midfielders
Brazilian expatriate sportspeople in Austria
Brazilian expatriate sportspeople in Sweden
Brazilian expatriate sportspeople in Germany
Brazilian expatriate sportspeople in Kuwait
Expatriate footballers in Austria
Expatriate footballers in Sweden
Expatriate footballers in Germany
Expatriate footballers in Kuwait